Paravur railway station (Code:PVU) is a railway station in the Indian municipal town of Paravur in Kollam district, Kerala. Paravur railway station falls under the Thiruvananthapuram railway division of the Southern Railway zone of Indian Railways. It is a 'NSG 5' class (formerly D-class) railway station coming under the Southern Railway zone.

The annual passenger earnings of Paravur railway station during 2016–2017 is Rs. 1,47,90,285 and it is third in position from Kollam district among the stations collecting more than Rs.1,00,00,000 through passenger tickets.

Paravur is connected to various cities in India like Kollam, Trivandrum, Ernakulam, Calicut, Thrissur, Kannur, Bengaluru, Chennai, Mumbai, Madurai, Kanyakumari, Mangalore, Pune, Salem, Coimbatore, Trichy and Tirunelveli through Indian Railways. Proximity of Paravur railway station to the core Paravur town and Paravur Municipal Bus Stand is making it as one of the important public transport hubs in the district and the state.

History 
The Madras–Quilon line was extended to the capital of the Princely State of Travancore. Paravur railway station was opened on 4 January 1918 along with the inauguration of Quilon–Trivandrum Central metre-gauge line. During that time, Paravur was the most important railway station between Kollam and Trivandrum with maximum number of halts of trains. Important trains like Chennai Mail had halt at Paravur then.

Layout 
The Paravur railway station has 3 platforms for handling passenger trains. The station has a single entrance near to platform 1.

Location 
Surrounding transport hubs:

Nearest bus stand: Paravur Municipal Bus Stand (800m)
Nearest airport: Trivandrum International Airport (67 km)

Significance 
Paravur is a tourism spot with estuaries, backwaters and beaches. Estuaries in Paravur attracts a good number of people. Paravur railway station is located at Paravur town centre, which gained in significance because of proximity to famous Puttingal Temple, Kollam Government Medical College in Parippally, proposed Kinfra Park in Polachira, LPG filling station in Ezhippuram (Parippally) etc. It is the only railway station in the Chathannoor constituency. People from Paravur municipal region and neighbouring Poothakkulam, Chathannoor, Chirakkara, Kappil (part of Edava panchayath) and Parippally panchayats are depending on this railway station. Paravur railway station is declared as the gateway station of Government Medical College Hospital, Kollam.

Annual passenger earnings from Paravur railway station

During 2012–2013, Southern Railway has given halt for 3 pairs of trains at Paravur railway station. That helped to give a 40% increase in revenue of the station.

Service

Express Trains

Some of the major trains having halt at the station.

Passenger trains

Paravur railway station is an 'Adarsh Railway Station'. However, stoppage of Ernad Express, Netravati Express, Amritha Express trains have been a long-standing demand of Paravur people. Two more Kollam– MEMU services and a Punalur–Kanyakumari Passenger are expected to start service soon with halts at Paravur.

See also 

 Paravur
 
 Thiruvananthapuram railway division
 Annual passenger earnings details of railway stations in Kerala

References 

Paravur
Thiruvananthapuram railway division
Railway stations opened in 1918
1918 establishments in India